Ögmundur Kristinsson may refer to:
 Ögmundur Kristinsson (footballer, born 1953), Icelandic footballer
 Ögmundur Kristinsson (footballer, born 1989), Icelandic footballer